Reinoso is a surname. Notable people with the surname include:

Alonso de Reinoso (1518–1567), Spanish Conquistador in Honduras, Mexico, Peru and Chile
Antonio García Reinoso (1623–1677), Spanish painter
Carlos Reinoso (born 1945), Chilean footballer and current manager of Mexican club Veracruz
Diego de Arce y Reinoso (1587–1665), Spanish bishop
Fortunato Moreno Reinoso, Mexican artisan from Ixmiquilpan
Gerardo Reinoso (born 1965), Argentine footballer
Jair Reinoso (born 1985), Colombian football striker
Jorge Vinatea Reinoso (1900–1931), Peruvian painter and caricaturist
José Francisco Reinoso (born 1950), Cuban footballer 
Lázaro Reinoso (born 1969), Cuban wrestler
Pablo Reinoso (footballer) (born 1985), Chilean footballer 
Pablo Reinoso (designer) (born 1955), Argentine–French artist and designer
Ricardo Gónzalez Reinoso (born 1965), Chilean footballer

See also
Reinoso, is a municipality and town located in the province of Burgos, Castile and León, Spain
Reinoso de Cerrato, is a municipality located in the province of Palencia, Castile and León, Spain

References